Anne Heywood (born 11 December 1931) is a British retired film actress, who is best known for her Golden Globe-nominated performance in The Fox.

Early life and career
Born as Violet Joan Pretty in 1931 to Harold and Edna E. ( Lowndes) Pretty in Handsworth, Birmingham, she won the Miss Great Britain title under her real name in 1950.

In 1947, aged 15, she joined Highbury Little Theatre in Sutton Coldfield and then won a Birmingham University Carnival Queen competition. She then entered a National Bathing Beauty Contest and won. She had a small role in Lady Godiva Rides Again (1951).

She made three TV appearances on the Carroll Levis TV Show and then spent four years touring UK theatres. 
Later she also attended the London Academy of Music and Dramatic Art. She had a small part in the comedy Find the Lady (1956).

Rank Organisation
Heywood was signed to the Rank Organisation, who changed her name to Anne Heywood and gave her small roles in Checkpoint (1956) and Doctor at Large (1957). The Danziger Brothers borrowed her for the lead in The Depraved (1957).

Rank gave Heywood the second female lead in Dangerous Exile (1957) and she was the female lead in Violent Playground (1958) with Stanley Baker, which established her as a film name. She made Floods of Fear (1958) with Howard Keel.
Herbert Wilcox used her as Frankie Vaughan's leading lady in The Heart of a Man (1959), then for Rank she starred in a romantic comedy Upstairs and Downstairs (1959). She was loaned to an Italian company for the historical costume drama Carthage in Flames (1960).

Raymond Stross
Heywood starred in the war movie A Terrible Beauty (1960) opposite Robert Mitchum. It was produced by Raymond Stross, who married Heywood. She starred in some British comedies, Petticoat Pirates (1961) and Stork Talk (1962) then did three thrillers produced by Stross: The Brain (1962), The Very Edge (1963), and 90 Degrees in the Shade (1965).  

Heywood was making High Jungle for MGM with Eric Fleming but that film was cancelled when Fleming drowned.

Heywood starred in a film adaptation of a D. H. Lawrence novel, The Fox (1967), produced by Stross. co-starring Sandy Dennis. It which caused controversy at the time due to its lesbian theme and nudity from Heywood. It was also a huge hit. A newspaper referred to her and Stross as the "English Carlo Pontis."

Heywood went to Italy to play a nun in The Lady of Monza (1969), playing The Nun of Monza, then did a movie with Richard Crenna produced by Stross, Midas Run (1969).<ref>Fred Leads Elegant Gypsies to 'Midas'
Chicago Tribune, 17 May 1968: pg. B16</ref> She was second billed in an espionage adventure film with Gregory Peck, The Chairman (1969) but was only on screen for five minutes. She was mentioned as a possible star of Myra Breckinridge (1970), but did not appear in the final film.

Later career

Heywood starred in I Want What I Want (1972), a box office and critical flop produced by Stross, then went to Italy for the giallo film The Killer Is on the Phone (1972) and The Nun and the Devil (1973), again as a nun. In Hollywood, she was the female lead in Trader Horn (1973), a failed remake of a 1931 classic film, then she returned to Italy for Love Under the Elms (1974).

She starred in Good Luck, Miss Wyckoff  (1979), produced by Stross. and in the Italian satanic horror Ring of Darkness (1979). Both films were failures. She then had supporting roles in Sadat (1981), and the science fiction film What Waits Below (1984). Her career declined in the 1980s. Her penultimate role was in a two-part episode of the popular United States television series The Equalizer, which starred British actor Edward Woodward, in 1988. She played Manon Brevard Marcel.

After the death of Stross in 1988, she retired from acting.

Personal life
Heywood was married to producer Raymond Stross, who produced most of her films, including A Terrible Beauty, The Brain, The Very Edge, Ninety Degrees in the Shade, The Fox, Midas Run, I Want What I Want, and Good Luck Miss Wyckoff''.

After Stross died in 1988, Heywood retired and has never appeared on screen since. In 1990, she married her second husband, George Danzig Druke, a former Assistant Attorney General of New York State, who died on 7 October 2021 in Beverly Hills, at the age of 98. Heywood resides in Beverly Hills, California.

Filmography

Awards and nominations

Further reading

References

External links
 

1931 births
Living people
British expatriates in the United States
English film actresses
English television actresses
Actresses from Birmingham, West Midlands
People from Handsworth, West Midlands